Ma Ke may refer to:

Ma Ke (composer) (1918–1976), Chinese composer and musicologist
Ma Ke (fashion designer) (born 1971), Chinese fashion designer
Ma Ke (producer), Hong Kong film producer
Ma Ke (actor) (born 1990), Chinese actor